Erythrolamprus semiaureus is a species of snake in the family Colubridae. The species is found in Paraguay, Argentina, Brazil, and Uruguay.

References

Erythrolamprus
Reptiles of Paraguay
Reptiles of Argentina
Reptiles described in 1862
Taxa named by Edward Drinker Cope